This list of Sesame Street puppeteers includes all who have worked on the show, as a regular, backup, guest puppeteer, etc., and by no means should be taken as complete, as many Muppeteers only have done one skit on the show, and thus aren't credited.

Jim Henson’s Muppets
 Pam Arciero: (1984–present)
Grundgetta, Crystal of the Squirrelles (puppeteering only), Mae (2005), Black and White Moo Wave Cow, Nani Bird, Various

 Anthony Asbury: (2001-present)
Various 

 Heather Asch: (2006–2009; 2019)
Hansel (2006), Various 

 Billy Barkhurst: (2009–2018)
Ernie (voice for Sesame Street Live shows (2009–2014); regular performer (2014–2018))

 Jennifer Barnhart: (2003–present)
Zoe (2016–present), Gladys the Cow (2003–present), Mama Bear (2003–present), Francine Lloyd Wright, Granny Snuffle, Goldilocks (2005), Super Chicken (2005), Granny Bird (2018–present), Mommy Snuffleupagus (2000s), Various

 Bill Barretta: (2001–2010)
Louie, Various 

Cheryl Blaylock: (1979–1984; 1990–present)
Mona Monster, Cookie Monster's Grandma (1982), Forgetful Jones' Mother and Forgetful Jones' cousin, Various

 Camille Bonora: (1987–1996)
Meryl Sheep, Ruby, Clementine (1987–1992), Goldilocks (1991–1996), Mama Bear (1993–1996), Gladys the Cow (1992-1996), Juliet, Loretta, Stella, Countess von Backwards (1990), Ingrid (Anything Muppet), Velma the Grouch, Grandma Count, Herry Monster's Mother (1993), Polly Darton (1990), Various

 Rickey Boyd: (2006–2013)
The Twiddlebugs (voices for CGI segments), Cookie Monster's Grandmother

 Fran Brill: (1970–2015)
Prairie Dawn (1970–2015), Zoe (1993–2015), Betty Lou (1970–1984), Little Bird, Roxie Marie, Polly Darton, Mrs. Crustworthy, Wanda Cousteau, Countess von Backwards (1994–2005), Nora Nicks, Helena, Goldilocks (2007), Mae (2006–2015), Gladys the Cow (1996-2003), Various

 Lisa Buckley: (1993–2008; 2019)
Betty Lou (1993–1998), Darlene of the Squirrelles, Various

 Julianne Buescher: (1991–1995; 2001-2020)
Sherry Netherland (1993–1995), Betty Lou's Mommy, Mama Countess, Sophie (1995), Various

 Warrick Brownlow-Pike: (2017–present)
Gonger, Various

 Tyler Bunch: (1993–present)
Louie (2007–present), Mr. Can You Guess, Big Bad Wolf (2007–2013), Super Chicken (2008), Various

 Leslie Carrara-Rudolph: (2006–present)
Abby Cadabby, Goldilocks (2012–present), Rosa, Rose, Gretel (2006), Velvet, Mae (2006), Baby Natasha (2014-present), Various

 Kevin Clash: (1980; 1984–2013)
Elmo (1985–2012), Hoots the Owl (1985–2012), Baby Natasha (1989-2012), Benny Rabbit (1990-2007), Wolfgang the Seal, Kingston Livingston III, The Grand High Triangle Lover, Clementine (1985–1987), Dr. Nobel Price (1984–1988), Chip Cat, Ferlinghetti Donizetti (1984–1986), Mel, Big Bad Wolf (1980s—2008), Preposterous, Watson, Segi (puppetry), Mario, Professor D. Rabbit, Dexter (head), J. P., Baby Fats Domino, Oliver, Gus, Warren Wolf, Buster the Horse (1980), Sophie (1985), Big Jeffy (1988), Cookie Monster's Mommy (2004), One of the Fuzzy Funk, One of the Git Along Little Doggies, One of the Rockheads, Various

 R. Bruce Connelly: (1993–present)
Barkley, Various 

 Bruce Lanoil: (1993–present) 
Various

 Frankie Cordero: (2016–present)
Rudy, Various

 Donna Kimball (2004-2016; 2019)
Various

 Austin Michael Costello: (2016–present)
 Assistant puppeteer

 Melissa Creighton: (2007–2010; 2014–present)
Various 

 Stephanie D'Abruzzo: (1993–present)
Prairie Dawn (2016–present), Curly Bear, Mae (2004; 2019–present), Lulu, Elizabeth, Mrs. Crustworthy (2016–present), Googel, Cookie Monster's Mommy (2016), Grover's Mommy (2001; 2016), Herry Monster's Mother (1998), Diva D'Abruzzo, Various

 Michael Earl: (1978–1981; 2007-2009)
Snuffy, Poco Loco, Leslie Mostly, Slimey the Worm, Forgetful Jones, Cowboy X, Sullivan, Tarnish Brother, Various

 Ryan Dillon: (2005–present)
Elmo (2013–present), Roosevelt Franklin (puppetry - 2019–present), Lefty the Salesman (2019–present), Don Music (2019–present), Dr. Nobel Price (2019), Various

 Alice Dinnean Vernon: (1994–2009; 2019)
Mama Bear (1996–2002), Goldilocks (1996–2004), Sherry Netherland (1995–1998), Little Murray Sparkles, Loretta (1996–1998), Phoebe (2001–2002), Various

 Artie Esposito: (2007)
Various 

 David Matthew Feldman: (1989-2001; 2019)
Various 

 Drew Massey: (2011-present)
Various

 Olga Felgemacher: (1977–1979)
Mrs. Bolinski, Various

 Allan Trautman: (2002–2010; 2019) 
Various

 Michael Frith: (1987-1999; 2003-2009)
Various 

 Peter Friedman: (1976–1978)
Mr. Snuffleupagus (back end), Two-Headed Monster (right head (1978) debut sketch), Various

 Fred "Garbo" Garver: (1984–1993)
Barkley, Dexter (hands), Garbo Gorilla, Various 

 Dave Goelz: (1992–2011; 2019)
Various

 Louise Gold: (1991–1996)
Sally Messy Yuckyael, Loretta (1993), Various

 Stacey Gordon: (2017–present)
Julia

 Sarah Oh: (2008–present)
Tessie Twiddlebug (2008-present), Various

 Tim Gosley: (1985-1990)
Mr. Honker (Follow That Bird), Various 

 Liz Hara: (2016–present)
Gladys the Cow (2021-present), Various 

 Dorien Davies: (2017–present) 
Various

 James Godwin (1995-2011; 2019) 
Various

 Chris Hayes: (2017–present)
Hoots the Owl, Various 

 Andy Hayward: (2007)
Various 

 Julie Westwood: (2015-2017)
Bebe (from The Furchester Hotel)

 Sarah Lyle: (2008-2011)
Maisie Weatherberry and Samson Bookworm (series 2 on Sesame Tree)

 Brian Henson: (1998-2013)
Various 

 Terri Hardin (2000-2004; 2009) 

Various
 Jane Henson: (1973–1974)
Various 

 Jim Henson: (1969–2002)
Ernie, Kermit the Frog, Guy Smiley, Little Chrissy (puppetry), Bip Bippadotta, Thomas Twiddlebug, Sinister Sam, Bad Bart, Little Bird (1969), Granny Fanny Nesselrode (1970; 1972), Spaceship Surprise Captain, The Genie (1973), Barry Rhymie (1978), Captain Vegetable (debut sketch), Charlie (occasionally), Yip Yip Martian, Two-Headed Monster's Mother, Harvey Monster (occasionally), Beautiful Day Monster, Various

 Richard Hunt: (1972–2000)
Two-Headed Monster (right half), Forgetful Jones (1981–1991), Gladys the Cow, Sully, Don Music, Placido Flamingo, Elmo (1984–1985), Sonny Friendly, Ferlinghetti Donizietti (1980–1984), Aristotle, Leo the Party Monster, Dip Cat, Brad, Timmy Twiddlebug, Captain Vegetable, Gilbert, Dr. Kvetch, Richard, Zero, Spaceship Surprise Mate, Worby the Grouch, Earl, Green Alphabeat, The Beetles' Lead Singer, Tarnish Brother, Grandpa Count, Grandpa Grouch, Larry Rhymie (1978), Mrs. Bolinski (1982), Tough Eddie (1984), Frazzle (1989), Harvey Monster (occasionally), Maurice Monster (occasionally), Yip Yip Martian, Mr. Snuffleupagus (back half, 1970s), Slimey the Worm (1978), Duke, One of the Rockheads, Various

 Michael Elizabeth Huston: (1986–1987)
Juliet, Various

 Eric Jacobson: (1994–present)
Grover (1998–present), Bert (1998–present), Oscar the Grouch (2015–present), Guy Smiley (2005–present), Two-Headed Monster (left half) (2016–present), Harvey Kneeslapper (2019), Various

 Haley Jenkins: (2014–present)
Mama Bear (2019-present), Karli, Various

 Frank Kane: (1979)
Mr. Snuffleupagus (back end)

 Guðmundur Þór Kárason : (1990-1995)
Various 

 John Kennedy: (1993–present)
The Amazing Mumford (2004; 2018–present), Various

 Kathleen Kim : (2016–present)
Elena, Betty Lou (2017-present), Various

 Jim Kroupa: (1983–2000)
One of the Rockheads, Various

 Tim Lagasse: (1998–2016; 2019-present)
Various 

 Peter Linz: (1991–present)
Ernie (2017–present), Herry Monster (2017–present), Osvaldo, el Gruñón, Timmy Twiddlebug, Samuel, Hansel (2005), Elmo (voice only, Spaghetti Space Chase grand opening ceremony) (2013), Captain Vegetable (2019), Various

 Rick Lyon: (1988–2008)
Various

 Spencer Lott: (2016–present)
Samuel, Various

 Peter MacKennan: (1987–1994)
Various

 Lara MacLean: (2001–present)
Zoe (2020-present), Various

 Noel MacNeal: (1983–present)
Daddy Snuffle, Mommy Snuffleupagus (1980s–1990s), Granny Snufflie (occasionally), Gretel (2005–2006), Smiley (2014-present), Ernie (1989-1992), Various

 Amanda Maddock (2006–2007)
Mary, Various

 Jim Martin (1989–2013; 2019)
Preston Rabbit, Lassie, Irvine (1991), Betty Lou's Dad, Various

 Gord Robertson (1985-2002)
Daddy Dodo (puppeteer), Various on Sesame Park

 Joey Mazzarino: (1990–2015)
Murray Monster, Papa Bear, Two-Headed Monster (left head) (2001–2016), Horatio the Elephant, Stinky the Stinkweed, Ingrid, Narf, Joey Monkey, Merry Monster, Colambo, Baby Tooth, Bernie Broccoli, The Fairy Godperson, Cousin Bear, Figby, The Tooth Fairy, Cyranose de Bergerac (2007), Frazzle (2014), The Big Bad Wolf (occasionally), Various

 Paul McGinnis: (2007–present)
Various

 Tracie Mick: (2007–2010)
Various

 Alison Mork: (1991–1993; 2009)
Various

 Brian Muehl: (1978–1984; 1988; 1993–1994; 2009-2019)
Barkley (1978–1984; 1987), Telly Monster (1980–1984), Elmo (1980–1984), Dr. Nobel Price, Grundgetta (1980–1984), Clementine, Pearl, Rusty, Alphabet Bates, Tarnish Brother, Gilbert (1980), One of the Rockheads, Various

 Kathryn Mullen: (1978–1994)
Grover's Mommy (1981), proto-Elmo (1981), Telly's Mom, Various

 Jerry Nelson: (1970–2012)
Count von Count (1972–2012), Mr. Snuffleupagus (1971–1978), Herry Monster (1970–2003), Mr. Johnson (1971–2012), Two-Headed Monster (left half) (1978–2000), The Amazing Mumford (1970–2011), Biff, Sherlock Hemlock, Little Jerry, Frazzle, Fred the Wonder Horse, Farley, Simon Soundman, Sam the Robot (occasionally), Herbert Birdsfoot, Big Bad Wolf (1971–2012), Poco Loco (1974–1976), Tina Twiddlebug, Rodeo Rosie, Mr. Chatterly, Noel Cowherd, Phil Harmonic, Sir John Feelgood, Tough Eddie, Cyranose de Bergerac, H. Ross Parrot, Japanese Storyteller, The Genie, Ernest the Grouch, Granny Grouch, Lefty's Boss, Marty, Joe Busby, Jack Be Nimble, Lord Hog, Vern, Cousin Monster, Jackman Wolf, Mary Rhymie (1978), Barry Rhymie (1980), Dr. Kvetch (1997), Cookie Monster's Pop, Cookie Monster's Sister, Charlie (occasionally), Harvey Monster (occasionally), Tarnish Brother, Mommy Snuffleupagus (1970s), proto-Elmo (1980), Yip Yip Martian, Officer Krupky (Episode 0441), Various

 Carmen Osbahr: (1990–present)
Rosita, Ovejita, Various

 Frank Oz: (1969–2000; occasionally - 2001–2013)
Bert (1969–2000; occasionally - 2003–2006), Cookie Monster (1969–2000; occasionally - 2001–2004), Grover (1969–2000; occasionally - 2002–2012), Roosevelt Franklin (puppetry), Harvey Kneeslapper, Lefty the Salesman, Professor Hastings, Tessie Twiddlebug (1974–1982), Prince Charming, Rufus, Officer Krupky (Episode 0581), Moe Busby, Beautiful Day Monster, Bart, Betty Lou (1969–1970), Charlie (occasionally), Harvey Monster (occasionally), Tarnish Brother, Larry Rhymie (1980), Various

 Eren Ozker: (1969 -1998) 
Various 

 Bob Payne: (1978–1980)
Telly Monster (1979 debut), Georgie, Slimey the Worm (1978), Mary Rhymie (1980), Various

 Annie Peterle: (2008)
Various

 Karen Prell: (1979–1981; 2003; 2019–2020)
Deena, Masha, Various

 Martin P. Robinson: (1981–present)
Snuffy, Telly Monster (1984–present), Slimey the Worm, Fluffy, Buster the Horse, Irvine, Monty, Vincent Twice, Mrs. Grouch, Sullivan, Shelley the Turtle, Old MacDonald, Dicky Tick, Ralphie, Tito, Otto the Grouch, Earl (1995), Bart (2017), Mommy Snuffleupagus (1980s), Freddy (2018), Big Bad Wolf (occasionally), One of the Rockheads, Various

 David Rudman: (1986–present)
Cookie Monster (2001–present), Baby Bear, Two-Headed Monster (right half) (1998–present), Humphrey, Chicago the Lion, Davey Monkey, Athena, Flo Bear, Sully (1993–1999, 2020–present), Sonny Friendly (1992–2000), Tessie Twiddlebug (1987–1996), Norman, Dr. Edwynn, Ernestine, Rudder Rabbit, Velma Blank, Duane, Tyrone, Freddy (2017), One of the Fuzzy Funk, One of the Git Along Little Doggies, Granny Snuffle (1989), Dip Cat (1992), Cookie Monster's Grandma (1994), Mommy Snuffleupagus (1990s), Yip Yip Martian, Various

 Daniel Seagren: (1969–1978)
Big Bird (occasionally), Guy Smiley (debut sketch), Various

 Judy Sladky: (1987–2010)
Alice Snuffleupagus

 Caroll Spinney: (1969–2018)
Big Bird, Oscar the Grouch, Bruno the Trashman, Granny Bird, Granny Fanny Nesselrode, Sam the Robot (occasionally), Shivers the Penguin, Lefty the Salesman (occasionally - 1970), proto-Cookie Monster (1970 sketch), proto-Grover (1970 sketch), Beautiful Day Monster, Various

 David Stephens: (2008)
Various

 Andy Stone: (1999; 2003; 2007)
Various 

 John Tartaglia: (1994–present)
Alfred Duck, Ernie (Play with Me Sesame, Sesame Street 4-D Magic - 2003), Phoebe (2002), Cookie Monster's Mommy (in Episode 4059), Yip Yip Martian, Various

 Toby Towson: (1978)
Barkley

 Gabriel Velez: (1984–1985; 1998; 2007; 2017-present)
Osvaldo, el Gruñón, Dani

 Matt Vogel: (1997–present)
Big Bird (1997-present), Count von Count (2013–present), Mr. Johnson (2014–present), Herb, Hansel (2006–present), Harvey Kneeslapper (2010), Forgetful Jones (2012; 2019), The Big Bad Wolf (2013), Kermit the Frog (2019), Sherlock Hemlock (2019), Biff (2020–present), Various

 Marc Weiner : 
(1993-1997, 2019-present)
Various 

 Steve Whitmire: (1993–2014)
Ernie, Kermit the Frog, Dr. Feel, Various

 Caroly Wilcox: (1969–1977)
Various 

 Victor Yerrid: (1998-2010; 2019)
Various 

 Bryant Young: (1979–present)
Snuffy (back end)

External links
 

Sesame Street puppeteers